Dronninglund Castle (Danish: Dronninglund Slot) is a former royal residence located in the town of Dronninglund in the northern part of the Jutland Peninsula, Denmark.

History
The castles history goes back to the 12th century, when it was the Benedictine monastery of Hundslund Priory. After the last nuns left in 1581, it was first owned by the Lindenow family. In 1690, Queen Charlotte Amalie acquired it. It is from her, that the palace takes the name Dronninglund, meaning queen-grove.

Nowadays the Castle of Dronninglund is owned by the fund of ”Marie E. & Harald Høgsbros fond til bevarelse af Dronninglund Slot” and is thereby an independent and self-governing institution. The first paragraph in the fund-regulations reads:

 

The castle now works as a hotel, a restaurant and a meeting place for conferences and larger gatherings like weddings, official meetings and various workshops. The restaurant runs a catering service as well.

References and notes

Sources

 Dronninglund Castle Official homepage
 J.P. Trap: Kongeriget Danmark, 4. udg. 1924 
 Ole Torp Andersen: Dronninglund Castle : royalty, nobility and civilians, 2006,  
 The History of Dronninglund Castle

External links
 Dronninglund Castle Official homepage

Listed buildings and structures in Brønderslev Municipality
Castles in Denmark
Restaurants in Denmark
Hotels in Denmark